Felix Grigoryevich Svetov (28 November 1927 – 2 September 2002) was a Russian writer, journalist, human rights activist and dissident. He received wide recognition for his novels and short stories, published exclusively in samizdat and tamizdat. He was also included in the Literary Collection of Aleksandr Solzhenitsyn. Svetov was persecuted for his human rights activities in the USSR.

Biography 

Felix Grigoryevich Fridlyand was born on 28 November 1927 in Moscow, USSR to Soviet historian  and his wife, Nekhama (Nadezhda) Lvovna Fridlyand. In 1937, when Felix was nine years old, his father was murdered by the Soviet authorities during the Great Purge. His mother was sentenced to eight years in a work camp in Potma, Zubovo-Polyansky District, Republic of Mordovia.

From 1952 to 1954 he worked as a journalist on Sakhalin Island, USSR. Then he returned to Moscow and started publishing literary critical articles and reviews in Moscow newspapers and magazines, most often in the Novy Mir literary journal. Between 1950 and 1960, Svetov published hundreds of articles and reviews, as well as four scientific papers, including the monograph Mikhail Svetov (1967). He spoke in defence of Andrei Sinyavsky, Yuli Daniel and Aleksandr Solzhenitsyn. In 1974, Solzhenitsyn's collection  was published in France, in which Svetov published the Russian Fates article under the pseudonym F. Korsakov. Svetov was married to writer Zoya Krakhmalnikova.

In 1978, Svetov's novel "Open the Doors to Me" was published in Paris. At that time, he and his wife were no longer published in official Soviet publications, they were subjected to pressure from the authorities. In 1982, he was expelled from Union of Soviet Writers, and, on 23 January 1985, he was arrested after a search of his apartment. He was convicted for his "defamatory" allegations that "innocent people [were] thrown into prison" in the USSR. The government perceived it as anti-Soviet propaganda. 

After a year in the Matrosskaya Tishina prison, he was sentenced to 5 years of exile and sent to Altai to his wife. While being exiled they were asked to write a "statement requesting a pardon", but they refused to do so.

In 1987, Svetov and Krakhmalnikova were released and returned to Moscow as part of Gorbachev's democratic campaign to free political prisoners. In 1990, Svetov was reinstated in Union of Soviet Writers. Many of his works have been published in the West. In Russia, he was published in the magazines Frontiers, Syntax, and Nadezhda. 

Svetov was a member of the Russian PEN Club. Since 2000 he also was a member of the pardon commission under the president of Russia, but in 2001 Vladimir Putin closed the commission. Svetov said that "Putin is a typical KGB type. If the snow is falling, they will calmly tell you, the sun is shining."

Svetov died on 2 September 2002, aged 74, in Moscow due to a myocardial infarction and was buried in Moscow at the Troyekurovskoye Cemetery. Sergei Chuprinin, the editor-in-chief of Znamya, said Svetov "thought first of all about making people freer".

Awards and nominations 
In 1985, Svetov received the literary  for his book An Experiment in Biography (1985).

On 7 January 2002, Svetov received gratitude from the president of Russia for his active participation in the work of the pardon commission under the president of Russia.

Legacy and bibliography 
2006 The Special Jury Award, Prize for Human Rights at the International Human Rights Film Festival "Stalker" was named after Svetov. Russian journalist Zoya Svetova is a daughter of Svetov.

References 

Russian writers
Burials in Troyekurovskoye Cemetery
1927 births
2002 deaths
20th-century Russian writers
Soviet human rights activists
Soviet dissidents
Russian journalists